The Olympic Tennis Centre is a tennis venue located in the Barra Olympic Park in Barra da Tijuca in the West Zone of Rio de Janeiro, Brazil. The centre hosted tennis events of the 2016 Summer Olympics, and the wheelchair tennis events of the 2016 Summer Paralympics. The centre was built on the site of the former Nelson Piquet International Autodrome.

History

Construction

The centre was designed by architect Gerkan, Marg and Partners, along with Schlaich Bergermann Partner.

The centre consists of a tennis stadium and 15 ancillary courts. The center court has a capacity of 10,000, with the two temporary arenas with a capacity of 5,000 and 3,000 respectively. The surface will be hard court, supplied by GreenSet.

Construction started in 2013 and was completed in 2016. However, the stadium faced numerous hurdles during construction. The biggest of these was when the city of Rio de Janeiro canceled the construction contract 200 days before the start of the games and finned the consortium responsible for delays 11 million reais ($2.7 million).

Opening
In December 2015, the centre court was named after Maria Esther Bueno, a former Brazilian tennis player, who became the first woman ever to win all four Grand Slam doubles titles in one year. This also marked the first ever event to be held at the Barra Olympic Park, which saw 75 Brazilian tennis players take part in a competition.

Legacy 
In July 2021, it was announced that the centre would be auctioned to the private initiative. However, as of February 2022, it is still managed by the federal government, through the Ministry of Citizenship.

The International Tennis Federation (ITF) has confirmed that, 20 years after the last Davis Cup match played in Rio de Janeiro, the Olympics Tennis Centre is set to host Brazil's match against Germany in the 2022 Davis Cup qualifying round.

It also played host to the Rio Tennis Classic ATP Challenger Tour event in December 2021.

See also
 Barra Olympic Park

References

External links

Olympic Games - Facilities - Barra Region (brasil2016.gov.br)
Rio de Janeiro Olympic venues map (rio2016.com)

Tennis venues in Brazil
Sports venues in Rio de Janeiro (city)
Proposed sports venues in Brazil
Venues of the 2016 Summer Olympics
Olympic tennis venues
Barra Olympic Park
Sports venues completed in 2016